In mathematical physics, some approaches to quantum field theory are more popular than others. For historical reasons, the Schrödinger representation is less favored than Fock space methods. In the early days of quantum field theory, maintaining symmetries such as Lorentz invariance, displaying them manifestly,  and proving renormalisation were of paramount importance. The Schrödinger representation is not manifestly Lorentz invariant and its renormalisability was only shown as recently as the 1980s by Kurt Symanzik (1981).

Within the Schrödinger representation, the Schrödinger wavefunctional stands out as perhaps the most useful and versatile functional tool, though interest in it is specialized at present.

The Schrödinger functional  is, in its most basic form, the time translation generator of state wavefunctionals. In layman's terms, it defines how a system of quantum particles evolves through time and what the subsequent systems look like.

Background
These eigenstates are not stationary. Time evolution is generated by the Hamiltonian, yielding the Schrödinger equation .

However, in quantum field theory, the coordinate is the field operator , which acts on the state's wave functional as

where "" indicates an unbound spatial argument.  This wave functional

is obtained by means of the field eigenstates

which are indexed by unapplied "classical field" configurations .  These eigenstates, like the position eigenstates above, are not stationary.  Time evolution is generated by the Hamiltonian, yielding the Schrödinger equation,

Thus the state in quantum field theory is conceptually a functional superposition of field configurations.

Example: Scalar Field
In the quantum field theory of (as example) a quantum scalar field , in complete analogy with the one-particle quantum harmonic oscillator, the eigenstate of this quantum field with the "classical field"  (c-number) as its eigenvalue,
 
is (Schwartz, 2013)

where  is the part of 
that only includes creation operators .  For the oscillator, this corresponds to the representation change/map to  the |x⟩ state from Fock states.

For a time-independent Hamiltonian , the Schrödinger functional is defined as

In the Schrödinger representation, this functional generates time translations of state wave functionals,  through

States

The normalized, vacuum state, free field wave-functional is the Gaussian

where the covariance K is

This is analogous to (the Fourier transform of) the product of each k-mode's ground state in the continuum limit, roughly (Hatfield 1992)

Each k-mode enters as an independent quantum harmonic oscillator. One-particle states are obtained by exciting a single mode, and have the form,

For example, putting an excitation in  yields (Hatfield 1992)

(The factor of  stems from Hatfield's setting .)

Example: Fermion Field

For clarity, we consider a massless Weyl–Majorana field  in 2D space in SO+(1, 1), but this solution generalizes to any massive Dirac bispinor in SO+(1, 3). The configuration space consists of functionals  of anti-commuting Grassmann-valued fields .

References
 Brian Hatfield, Quantum Field Theory of Point Particles and Strings. Addison Wesley Longman, 1992. See Chapter 10 "Free Fields in the Schrodinger Representation".
 I.V. Kanatchikov, "Precanonical Quantization and the Schroedinger Wave Functional." Phys. Lett. A 283 (2001) 25–36. Eprint arXiv:hep-th/0012084, 16 pages.
 R. Jackiw, "Schrodinger Picture for Boson and Fermion Quantum Field Theories." In Mathematical Quantum Field Theory and Related Topics: Proceedings of the 1987 Montréal Conference Held September 1–5, 1987 (eds. J.S. Feldman and L.M. Rosen, American Mathematical Society 1988).
 H. Reinhardt, C. Feuchter, "On the Yang-Mills wave functional in Coulomb gauge." Phys. Rev. D 71 (2005) 105002. Eprint arXiv:hep-th/0408237, 9 pages.
 D.V. Long, G.M. Shore, "The Schrodinger Wave Functional and Vacuum States in Curved Spacetime." Nucl.Phys. B 530 (1998) 247–278. Eprint arXiv:hep-th/9605004, 41 pages.
 Kurt Symanzik, "Schrödinger representation and Casimir effect in renormalizable quantum field theory". Nucl. Phys.B 190 (1981) 1–44, doi:10.1016/0550-3213(81)90482-X.
 K. Symanzik, "Schrödinger Representation in Renormalizable Quantum Field Theory". Chapter in Structural Elements in Particle Physics and Statistical Mechanics, NATO Advanced Study Institutes Series 82 (1983) pp 287–299, doi:10.1007/978-1-4613-3509-2_20.
 Martin Lüscher, Rajamani Narayanan, Peter Weisz, Ulli Wolff, "The Schrödinger Functional - a Renormalizable Probe for Non-Abelian Gauge Theories". Nucl.Phys.B 384 (1992) 168–228, doi:10.1016/0550-3213(92)90466-O. Eprint arXiv:hep-lat/9207009.
 Matthew  Schwartz (2013). Quantum Field Theory and the Standard Model, Cambridge University Press, Ch.14.

Quantum field theory
Functional